John J. Foley (October 25, 1857 - Unknown death) was a Major League Baseball pitcher who played in  with the Providence Grays.

Foley pitched in one game in his career, a complete game loss against the St. Louis Maroons on September 18, 1885.

External links

Major League Baseball pitchers
Providence Grays players
19th-century baseball players
Quincy Quincys players
Buffalo Bisons (minor league) players
Chattanooga Lookouts players
1857 births
Baseball players from Vermont
People from Brattleboro, Vermont
Year of death missing